Sittampoondi is a small village in Namakkal district, Tamil Nadu India. The nearest city is Tiruchengode. Sittampoondi is known for its green Sugarcane and Paddy fields. This fertile village is fed by the water lines from the river Kaveri. Sittampoondi is the group of eighteen villages (called Patties). Gounder's are the dominant community people in this area and most of them are farmers.

Platinum discovery
Sittampoondi is in lime light for the last few years when the Indian Government declared the Platinum reserve in this area.

Study on Lunar Soil
Geologists from Periyar University, Salem; the National Institute of Technology, Tiruchi; the, Indian Institute of Science, Bangalore, and the National Geophysical Research Institute, Hyderabad, "concurred" that the rocks from Sittampoondi and Kunnamalai were similar in properties to that of the soil on the moon, Dr. Annadurai said.

S. Anbazhagan, Professor and Head of the Department of Geology, Periyar University, said: "We had done spectral studies on the lunar soil and we discovered its equivalent at Sittampoondi in 2004 when I was working in the Indian Institute of Technology-Bombay. ISRO’s soil scientists coordinated with us in this project."

The soil and rocks, similar to what is found on the moon, have been located at Kunnamalai and Sittampoondi villages. This soil with rocks is used by ISRO to test its rover of Chandrayan-2, which will land on the moon in 2017

Villages in Namakkal district